True Romance is the debut studio album by English singer Charli XCX. It was released on 12 April 2013 by Asylum and Atlantic Records. Originally scheduled for release in April 2012, the album's release was delayed for a full year and had been in the making since early 2010 when Charli met with producer Ariel Rechtshaid in Los Angeles. To promote the album's release, Charli embarked on a three-date UK promotional tour in April 2013.

Background and release
"You're the One" has been compared to Siouxsie and the Banshees' 1991 song "Kiss Them for Me" and Charli agreed: "At the time, I was listening to a lot of dark pop, so I was inspired by a lot of the deep bass sounds. Sure, Siouxsie is there, too. We just kind of rolled with it."

Charli explained the meaning behind the album's title saying, "Every corner of my own romantic history is explored on this record, so for me, it's very raw, it's very honest, and it's very true." The majority of the album's tracks were previously released on the You're the One EP, and through the Heartbreaks and Earthquakes and Super Ultra mixtapes. The album is named after the Quentin Tarantino-written 1993 film of the same name, which is sampled on "Velvet Dreaming" from the Super Ultra mixtape. On 9 April 2013, the standard edition of album became available to stream on Pitchfork in full.

Critical reception

True Romance received generally positive reviews from music critics. At Metacritic, which assigns a normalised rating out of 100 to reviews from mainstream publications, the album received an average score of 76, based on 18 reviews. Pitchforks Marc Hogan wrote that Charli "pull[s] from moody 80s synth-pop, sassy turn-of-the-millennium girl groups, and state-of-the-art contemporary producers to create something distinctive and immediately memorable", concluding that she "stamps her personality across the entire project, and True Romance suggests she'll be worth following for a while." Rebecca Nicholson of The Guardian found the album to be "surprisingly oddball and packed with production quirks that often resemble a smoothed-off Grimes", adding that "while there's still the odd remnant of Marina-lite pop, this sounds like an imminent star steadily staking a claim to her own turf."

Heather Phares of AllMusic noted that Charli "has a flair for combining a wide array of pop culture sources into something fresh and familiar, as well as a fondness for strong female characters." Phares continued, "Since quite a few of these songs were already road-tested, it's not surprising that this is a strong debut, but just how consistently catchy and personal True Romance is might raise a few eyebrows." Spins Puja Patel viewed True Romance as "a strident departure from those frivolities so far as solid, true-to-aim songwriting is concerned, but the divergence and a touch of the silliness remains: Goth, she is not. Dramatic? A bit. Complicated? Like every budding pop starlet. Defiant? Absolutely." Despite stating that the album "is confusing at times and will most definitely require multiple listens", Enio Chiola of PopMatters opined that Charli is "the fun pop you don't have to be embarrassed about listening to, and she's definitely worth focusing your attention. True Romance is certainly the true beginning of an illustrious career." Lauren Martin of Fact commented, "Love, lust and longing are chronicled and dissected in True Romance through online relationships being gradually given tangible, tactile form, setting Charli up as a young pop star to be reckoned with." Rolling Stone critic Will Hermes described True Romance as "the pop-album equivalent of a wicked Tumblr".

In a mixed review, Nick Levine of NME felt that although the album "begins strongly" with "Nuclear Seasons" and "You (Ha Ha Ha)", the songs eventually "become samey and Charli [...] shoves some kind of speak-rap into almost every track", concluding, "At the moment, her music is best consumed in blog-sized chunks, not as a stodgy 48-minute album." Similarly, John Murphy of musicOMH expressed that "[t]here's much to enjoy on True Romance, although it's probably best sampled in small doses as it doesn't hang together that successfully over the course of an album." Paula Mejia of Consequence of Sound dismissed the album as "a valiant attempt that doesn't do much more than provide the soundtrack for 'getting ready to go out' songs on tinny laptop speakers." Slant Magazines Kevin Liedel criticised the album as "a little too slickly produced and self-aware to deliver the kind of spontaneous creativity or carefree chic that Charli XCX aims for", while dubbing its music "almost incidental, a postscript to the larger brand, confirming that whoever 'Charli XCX' actually is, she's more product than artist."

Commercial performance
True Romance debuted at number 85 on the UK Albums Chart, selling 1,241 copies in its first week. By February 2015, the album had sold 6,302 copies in the United Kingdom. In the United States, it entered the Heatseekers Albums chart at number five, and fell to number 22 the following week. The album had sold 12,000 copies in the US as of May 2014. True Romance debuted and peaked at number 11 on the ARIA Hitseekers chart in Australia.

Track listing

Notes
  signifies a vocal producer
  signifies an additional producer
 On the digital edition and vinyl repress of the album, "Set Me Free" is titled "Set Me Free (Feel My Pain)".

Sample credits
 "You (Ha Ha Ha)" samples "You" by Gold Panda.
 "So Far Away" samples "A Dream Goes On Forever" and "An Elpee's Worth of Toons" by Todd Rundgren.

Personnel
Credits adapted from the liner notes of True Romance.

Musicians

 Charli XCX – vocals
 Tom Boddy – additional programming ; album remixes
 Andrew Wilkinson – additional programming 
 Dimitri Tikovoi – programming 
 Louise Burns – additional vocals 
 Brooke Candy – vocals 
 Hal Ritson – additional keyboards, programming 
 Richard Adlam – additional keyboards, programming 
 Miriam Stockley – additional backing vocals

Technical

 Ariel Rechtshaid – production ; additional production 
 Rich Costey – mixing 
 Chris Kasych – mixing assistance, Pro Tools engineering 
 Jocke Åhlund – production 
 Mark "Spike" Stent – vocal production ; mixing 
 Matty Green – mixing assistance 
 David Emery – mixing assistance 
 Dimitri Tikovoi – production 
 Blood Diamonds – production 
 Dan Aslet – vocal production ; mixing 
 Neil Comber – mixing 
 Paul White – production 
 J£zus Million – production ; mixing 
 Patrik Berger – production 
 Dave Bascombe – mixing 
 Stuart Hawkes – mastering
 Jeremy Cooper – editing

Artwork
 Andy Hayes – design
 Dan Curwin – photography

Charts

Release history

References

External links
 

2013 debut albums
Albums produced by Ariel Rechtshaid
Albums produced by Dimitri Tikovoi
Asylum Records albums
Atlantic Records albums
Charli XCX albums
Albums produced by Joakim Åhlund
Dark wave albums